is a passenger railway station  located in the city of Sakaiminato, Tottori Prefecture, Japan. It is operated by the West Japan Railway Company (JR West).

Lines

Station layout
The station is unattended.

Adjacent stations

History
Babasakichō Station opened on 1 November 1987.

Passenger statistics
In fiscal 2018, the station was used by an average of 460 passengers daily.

Surrounding area
Sakaiminato City Hall
Tottori Prefectural Sakai High School
Sakaiminato Municipal Kamimichi Elementary School
Tottori Saiseikai Sakaiminato General Hospital

See also
List of railway stations in Japan

References

External links 

 0641715  Babasakichō Station from JR-Odekake.net 

Railway stations in Japan opened in 1987
Railway stations in Tottori Prefecture
Stations of West Japan Railway Company
Sakaiminato, Tottori